Sardar Khan Niazi is the Chief Editor and Publisher of Daily Pakistan, Daily The Patriot, Daily Pak Watan, Daily Action, Daily Nawa-e-Nawabshah, Monthly Naya Rukh, and also Chairman of Pakistan Group of Publications. Sardar Khan Niazi has received many awards for writing columns on issues concerning national interest. Niazi also acts as the CEO of Roze TV channel, and CEO of SK Group (registered and established by his father late Ghulam Hassan Khan, which according to Gallup 2008–09 Survey enjoys 23rd ranking among the biggest Business Groups of Pakistan). Niazi is the chairman of the Supportive Kin of Nation Trust (SKN Trust). The Trust's services range from establishing first ever dialysis center in Pakistan, to extending financial help to victims of Ojari camp earthquake of 2005, and recent flooding victims in Pakistan. The SKN Trust set up camps for IDP’s of Swat on all Stations. Niazi personally visited all the camps to supervise provision of food and medicines.
Sardar Khan Niazi received the Tamgh-i-Imtiaz on behalf of his services in Journalism. Dr. Qadeer Khan acknowledged Niazi's services related to the nuclear program and awarded a gold medal. In recognition of his services for raising voice against corruption National Accountability Bureau (NAB) awarded him a special plaque.

Sardar Khan Niazi Vs State Of Pakistan

References

External links
 pakobserver.net
 Today's News – President confers 189 civil awards
 Civil awards conferred on 47
 dailypakistan.pk
 www.dailythepatriot.com
 www.rafaymall.pk
 rozenews.com.pk

Pakistani editors
Pakistani publishers (people)
Living people
Year of birth missing (living people)